The Apostolic Vicariate (or Vicariate Apostolic) of Esmeraldas is a missionary pre-diocesan circonscription of the Roman Catholic Church. Its cathedral see Catedral Cristo Rey is located in the town of Esmeraldas in Ecuador's homonymous Pacific coastal province. It is exempt, i.e. directly subject to the Holy See, not part of any ecclesiastical province.

History 
On 14 December 1945 Pope Pius XII established the Apostolic Prefecture of Esmeraldas on territory split from the Diocese of Portoviejo.
 
It was elevated to an Apostolic Vicariate by the same pope on 14 November 1957.

Ordinaries 
All have been missionary members of a Latin Catholic order

Apostolic Prefect
 Jeroteo della SSma Vergine del Carmelo, O.C.D. (25 October 1946 – 28 July 1954)

Apostolic Vicars
 Angelo Barbisotti, F.S.C.J., Titular Bishop of Caunas (14 November 1957 – 17 September 1972)
 Enrico Bartolucci Panaroni, M.C.C.I., Titular Bishop of Castulo  (14 June 1973 – 10 February 1995)
 Eugenio Arellano Fernández, M.C.C.I., Titular Bishop of Cellæ in Proconsulari (1 June 1995 – 5 July 2021)
 Antonio Crameri, S.S.C., Titular Bishop of Apollonia (5 July 2021 – present)

See also 
 Roman Catholicism in Ecuador

Notes and references

Sources and external links
 GigaCatholic, with incumbent biography links

Apostolic vicariates
Roman Catholic dioceses in Ecuador
Christian organizations established in 1945